"Minnie the Moocher" is a jazz-scat song first recorded in 1931 by Cab Calloway and His Orchestra, selling over a million copies. "Minnie the Moocher" is most famous for its nonsensical ad libbed ("scat") lyrics (for example, "Hi De Hi De Hi De Ho"). In performances, Calloway would have the audience and the band members participate by repeating each scat phrase in a form of call and response, until making it too fast and complicated for the audience to replicate it.

Released by Brunswick Records, the song was the biggest chart-topper of 1931. Calloway publicized and then celebrated a "12th birthday" for the song on June 17, 1943, while performing at New York's Strand Theatre. He reported that he was then singing the song at both beginning and end of four performances daily, and then estimated his total performances to date: "she's kicked the gong around for me more than 40,000 times."

In 1978, Calloway recorded a disco version of "Minnie the Moocher" on RCA Records which reached No. 91 on the Billboard R&B chart.

"Minnie the Moocher" was inducted into the Grammy Hall of Fame in 1999, and in 2019 was selected for preservation in the National Recording Registry as "culturally, historically, or aesthetically significant" by the Library of Congress. It has been argued that the record was the first jazz record to sell a million copies.

Basis 
The song is based lyrically on Frankie "Half-Pint" Jaxon's 1927 version of the early 1900s vaudeville song "Willie the Weeper" (Bette Davis sings this version in The Cabin in the Cotton).

The lyrics are heavily laden with drug references. The character "Smokey" is described as "cokey", meaning a user of cocaine; the phrase "kick the gong around" was a slang reference to smoking opium. The song ends with Calloway wailing "Poor Min!" insinuating an untimely end for the protagonist.  The "hi-de-ho" scat lyrics came about when Calloway forgot the lyrics to the song one night during a live radio concert.

Notable performances and cover versions
"Minnie the Moocher" has been covered or simply referenced by many other performers. Its refrain, particularly the call and response, is part of the language of American jazz. At the Cab Calloway School of the Arts, which is named for the singer, students perform "Minnie the Moocher" as a traditional part of talent showcases.

In 1967, the song was covered again by an Australian band, The Cherokees. A version by the Reggae Philharmonic Orchestra made number 35 in the UK Singles Chart late in 1988. Tupac Shakur and Chopmaster J made a hip hop version of the song in 1989. The song can be found on Beginnings: The Lost Tapes 1988–1991 from 2007. A contemporary swing band, Big Bad Voodoo Daddy, recorded a cover on their 1998 album, Americana Deluxe. L.A.-based new wave/rock band Oingo Boingo has covered this song, as well as other Cab Calloway songs, during live performances throughout their career, dating back to their years as Mystic Knights of the Oingo Boingo.

On January 19, 2001, Wyclef Jean opened his "All Star Jam @ Carnegie Hall" concert with this number, walking to the stage from the back of the audience, dressed all in white. The song "The Mighty O" by Outkast is heavily inspired by the song.

The English singer-songwriter Robbie Williams is famed (and often lightheartedly ridiculed) for his frequent tendency to engage in call and response with his audience. As a tongue in cheek retort to the criticism, he performed "Minnie the Moocher" on the Take the Crown Stadium Tour, albeit changing the lyrics to be about himself. He then released a studio recording of the song on his 10th studio album, Robbie Williams Swings Both Ways.

In 1992, rapper Positive K made a song called "Minnie the Moocher" for his 1992 album, The Skills Dat Pay da Bills.

During a performance on the first season of American Idol, Tamyra Gray performed this song on "Big Band" night.

Hugh Laurie, in a 2006 interview on The Tonight Show with Jay Leno, stated that his charity cover band, Band from TV, has the most popular recording of "Minnie the Moocher" available on the iTunes Store. Laurie also performs a part of the song in the first episode of the British comedy television series Jeeves and Wooster, playing the role of Bertie Wooster, duetting with Reginald Jeeves, played by Stephen Fry. The episode first aired in 1990. A recording was later released on the Jeeves and Wooster soundtrack.

Calloway performs the song in the 1980 comedy film The Blues Brothers in which he also plays a supporting role.

In popular culture

Film and television
"Minnie the Moocher" features in the television show Carnivàle.

Ann's father sings a shortened version of the song on an episode of That Girl.

On an episode of The Fresh Prince of Bel-Air, Will Smith performs the "hi-de-ho" chorus and references Heidi Fleiss in the process.

Opera singer Grace Moore performed the song in the 1937 film When You're in Love, in a departure from her usual style.

Although it is not heard, the song is mentioned by name in the 1991 Sylvester Stallone movie, Oscar.

The song is performed on screen with a video of Calloway at every New York Jets home game.

In 1932, Calloway sang the first lines of the song in the title sequence of comedy film The Big Broadcast. He performs the full song later in the film, miming snorting cocaine in between verses.

Calloway performed the entire song in the movie Rhythm and Blues Revue (1955), filmed at the Apollo Theater. Much later, in 1980 at age 73, Calloway performed the song in the movie The Blues Brothers. Calloway's character Curtis, a church janitor and the Blues Brothers' mentor, magically transforms the band into a 1930s swing band and sings "Minnie the Moocher" when the crowd becomes impatient at the beginning of the movie's climactic production number. According to director John Landis in the 1998 documentary The Stories Behind the Making of "The Blues Brothers", Calloway initially wanted to do a disco variation on his signature tune, having done the song in several styles in the past, but Landis insisted that the song be rendered faithfully to the original big band version. Halfway through the song though, Calloway and the band would do a partial section of the song at a much faster pace, similar to Calloway's later performances.

 In the 1935 Marx Brothers' film A Night at the Opera, Groucho Marx famously quipped, "You're willing to pay him a thousand dollars a night just for singing? Why, you can get a phonograph record of 'Minnie the Moocher' for 75 cents. And for a buck and a quarter, you can get Minnie."

In the 1979 film Escape to Athena, Stefanie Powers sings "Minnie the Moocher" for an audience of German officers in a POW camp.

The band Mystic Knights of the Oingo Boingo performed the song in the Richard Elfman film Forbidden Zone, with altered lyrics and titled "Squeezit the Moocher", after one of the movie's characters, Squeezit Henderson. Danny Elfman, playing a rather vaudevillian Satan, sings the song as his band (other members of Oingo Boingo at the time) respond to his calls. Oogie Boogie's song from The Nightmare Before Christmas, which Elfman composed the music for, is also similar to "Minnie the Moocher".

The popular refrain is performed by a funeral band in the 1999 film Double Jeopardy.

The song is played multiple times in the early stages of the 2013 film Magic Magic starring Juno Temple.

The song was used in the Danish children's circus Cirkus Summarum with other lyrics. It is sung by Silja Okking with the audience repeating the nonsensical lyrics in the chorus.

Animation
In 1932, Calloway recorded the song for a Fleischer Studios Talkartoon short cartoon, also called Minnie the Moocher, starring Betty Boop and Bimbo, and released on March 11, 1932. Calloway and his band provide most of the short's score and themselves appear in a live-action introduction, playing "Prohibition Blues". The thirty-second live-action segment is the earliest-known film footage of Calloway. In the cartoon, Betty decides to run away from her parents after they insist in old-country broken English that she eat Hasenpfeffer despite her not wanting to (to the Harry Von Tilzer tune "They Always Pick on Me"), and Bimbo comes with her. While walking away from home, Betty and Bimbo wind up in a spooky area and hide in a hollow tree. A spectral walrus—whose gyrations were rotoscoped from footage of Calloway dancing—appears to them, and begins to sing "Minnie the Moocher", with many fellow ghosts following along, during which they do scary things like place ghosts on electric chairs who still survive after the shock, and a cat feeding her kittens so much milk that they grow big immediately while the mother grows thin and dies. After singing the whole number, the ghosts chase Betty and Bimbo all the way back to Betty's home. While Betty is hiding under the covers of her bedsheets, her runaway note is torn up and the remaining letters read "Home Sweet Home". In 1933 another Betty Boop/Cab Calloway cartoon with "Minnie the Moocher" was The Old Man of the Mountain.

The 1933 Pooch the Pup cartoon She Done Him Right also features the song "Minnie the Moocher's Wedding Day". It was sung by the nightclub singer whom Pooch is in love with.

In "Blue Harvest", the kickoff episode of the sixth season of Family Guy, "Minnie the Moocher" is played while Han Solo (Peter Griffin) and Luke Skywalker (Chris Griffin) disguise themselves as stormtroopers to lead Obi-Wan Kenobi (Herbert), Chewbacca (Brian Griffin), C-3PO (Glenn Quagmire) and R2-D2 (Cleveland Brown) away from the Millennium Falcon to infiltrate the Death Star, coolly walking so as not to be noticed by the stormtrooper guards. This is a direct reference to the film The Blues Brothers, as Jake and Elwood Blues try to sneak past the police officers at their concert. When Stewie Griffin is writing a song to a love interest in the season 7 episode "Ocean's Three and a Half", Brian Griffin ridicules him for choosing an unoriginal formula for songwriting. When Stewie objects and asks for examples, Brian lists the song among many others as examples. Peter also sings the song in his car in the season 12 episode "Finders Keepers".

Music

 Minnie herself is mentioned in a number of other Cab Calloway songs, including "Minnie the Moocher's Wedding Day", "Ghost of Smoky Joe", "Kickin' the Gong Around", "Minnie's a Hepcat Now", "Mr. Paganini – Swing for Minnie", "We Go Well Together", and "Zah Zuh Zaz". Some of these songs indicate that Minnie's boyfriend Smoky was named Smoky Joe as well.
 A number of Cab Calloway albums are called Minnie the Moocher.  In 1932, the Boswell Sisters did their own jazz version of "Minnie the Moocher's Wedding Day" as did Fletcher Henderson and The Mills Brothers, followed in 1937 by Benny Goodman with an instrumental version.
 In the 1935 Marx Brothers' film A Night at the Opera, Groucho Marx famously quipped, "You're willing to pay him a thousand dollars a night just for singing? Why, you can get a phonograph record of 'Minnie the Moocher' for 75 cents. And for a buck and a quarter, you can get Minnie."
 Jeffrey Lewis referenced "Minnie the Moocher" in his song "Mini-Theme: Moocher from the Future" from his 2009 album 'Em Are I.
 In 1931, the same year that Calloway recorded the first version of "Minnie the Moocher", his sister Blanche (who performed as Blanche Calloway with her "Joy Boys") recorded "Growlin' Dan", in which Minnie is evoked, along with a variation on Calloway's "hi-de-ho".
 In 1940, The Dandridge Sisters performed the Jimmie Lunceford song "Minnie the Moocher Is Dead".
 Minnie is referenced in Clarence Williams and His Orchestra's 1934 song "Jerry the Junker": "Well, you've heard about Minnie the Moocher/ And about Smokey Joe / Gather 'round friends and I'll tell you a tale / Of a cat you oughta know".
 Referenced in Beastie Boys song “Finger Lickin’ Good”: “‘Cause I’m Pete the Puma, Minnie the Moocher/Got every type of flavor that will suit ‘ya.” The song was featured on the band’s multi-platinum album Check Your Head (1992).

References

External links
Ernest Rodgers' recording of Willie the Weeper, at the Internet Archive.

1931 songs
Articles containing video clips
Cab Calloway songs
Grammy Hall of Fame Award recipients
Jazz songs
Songs about drugs
Songs with lyrics by Irving Mills
The Blues Brothers songs
United States National Recording Registry recordings